Bernard Yeoh Cheng Han (born April 11, 1969 in Kuala Lumpur) is a Malaysian sport shooter and restaurateur. He was selected to compete for Malaysia in trap shooting at the 2004 Summer Olympics, finishing in thirty-fourth place. Yeoh is a member of the A1 Shooting Ground in Barnet, England, United Kingdom, where he trains full-time under Italian-born coach Claudio Capaldo.

Yeoh qualified for the Malaysian squad, as a 35-year-old, in the men's trap at the 2004 Summer Olympics in Athens after having accepted a wildcard entry invitation from the International Shooting Sport Federation. He fired 107 out of 125 targets to finish thirty-fourth in the qualifying phase, failing to advance to the final.

Yeoh is also the proprietor of Kai Mayfair in London, a fine dining Chinese restaurant which has held 1 Michelin star since 2009. He opened the restaurant in 1993.

References

External links
ISSF Profile

1969 births
Living people
Malaysian male sport shooters
Olympic shooters of Malaysia
Shooters at the 2004 Summer Olympics
Shooters at the 2006 Asian Games
Shooters at the 2010 Asian Games
Sportspeople from Kuala Lumpur
Southeast Asian Games silver medalists for Malaysia
Southeast Asian Games bronze medalists for Malaysia
Southeast Asian Games medalists in shooting
Competitors at the 2015 Southeast Asian Games
Competitors at the 2017 Southeast Asian Games
Competitors at the 2019 Southeast Asian Games
Asian Games competitors for Malaysia